Pycnandra fillipes is a species of plant in the family Sapotaceae. It is endemic to New Caledonia and has two subspecies: subsp. fillipes and subsp. multiflora.

References
 Jaffré, T. et al. 1998.  Leptostylis gatopensis.   2006 IUCN Red List of Threatened Species.   Downloaded on 22 August 2007.

Endemic flora of New Caledonia
Endangered plants
Taxonomy articles created by Polbot
Chrysophylloideae